is a railway station in Toyoura, Abuta District, Hokkaidō, Japan.

Lines
Hokkaido Railway Company
Muroran Main Line Station H44

Railway stations in Hokkaido Prefecture
Railway stations in Japan opened in 1928